Self Taught is a Canadian hip-hop group formed in 2002 in Vancouver Thaiwab. Its three members, which are all producers/emcees, consists of Cliff Herman, Vintage and Jay Robillard. The group is known for embracing the Self Taught mantra by producing all their beats, mixing and mastering their albums and producing their own videos. The group has released three albums, "Arrival", in the summer of 2007, "5 Year Journey" in 2012 and "Feast of Fools" in 2013.

Arrival
Arrival sold respectably across the world including Canada, USA, Europe, Africa and South America. According to the group they have yet to sell an album in Asia but have grandiose plans to be big in Japan 2047. The album continues to maintain significant digital downloads and garner much attention.

Five-Year Journey
Dubbed as a new-age throwback, the album includes 15 songs with features from Inkspill, K-Rec, Mike Decline, and Allan Rodger. The album is dedicated to the group’s longtime friend, Colin Van Dyk, who died unexpectedly in 2010.

The first single and video from the album was Self Taught Life: produced by Mike Decline.
The second single and video from the album was Not Down: co-produced by K-Rec with guitar by Allan Rodger

Fly Away, was featured on episode 506 of the world-famous weekly radio show WEFUNK Radio.
Lucifer, was featured in an ESPN surfing documentary (Barrel Hunting Season).

Feast of Fools
A 10-song album which saw the group once again push their creative limits and provide fans with something unlike their previous albums.

The first single and video from the album was Hands Up (The Anthem)
The second single and video from the album was Way Back Home
The third single and video from the album was No Fear (Figured Out)

Production and Features
The group has produced tracks for artists including Discreet Da Chosen 1, Dvice, Lenny Diko, Inkspill and Paul B.
The group has collaborated with artists and producers including Surveillance, Inkspill, Mike Decline, Paul B, Lenny Diko, Azrael, Anonymouz, Ashleigh Eymann, Ill-legitimate Records, Ozzie Chan, Sythe, Friends with the Help, Low Lux, Young Nige, Sesh, Francesca Belcourt, K-Rec, Danny Diggs, Ryan Stinson, Metawon and Joe Bro.

Label 
The following summary has been taken from the labels ReverbNation page:

Chamberlain Drive is a Vancouver-based record label with artists that include Cloud City Classic, Self Taught, Inkspill and Jay Robillard. The combined musical talent of these individuals can only be explained as the same awe inspiring feeling that overcomes your body after eating 8 Big Macs after a 6-month vegan diet. It will rock you to the core and leave you shaking in the fetal position.

CD Baby 
The following summary has been taken from the groups CD Baby page:
Many years ago Cliff Herman and Vintage began taking the necessary steps to parlay a common interest into something more, something of substance.

In 2002 they began producing music while feeding off of each other’s enthusiasm. A unique sound was emerging from a combination of non-sampled and sampled beats. After years of practice Vintage and Cliff Herman were beginning to find their form.

The opportunity to accomplish something they had not imagined prior to 2002 was beginning to become an apparent reality. With a mass of hardware and a home studio capable of producing professional sound quality, Vintage and Cliff Herman decided to work towards an epic and unparalleled album. An album to be heralded by a paper of a Herald-like stature.

Self Taught worked feverishly and soon accumulated a library of material to rival that of their local book drive. In late 2006, after three years of back-breaking work, their debut album Arrival was completed.

Since the album, the group has performed a string of shows culminating most recently with performances at the Yale with live blues band Surveillance. With Surveillance backing them and the introduction of a new member, soul singer Jay Robillard, Self Taught is becoming an act that you can not afford to miss.

References

External links
 Self Thaiwab at Myspace

Musical groups established in 2002
Musical groups from Vancouver
Canadian hip hop groups
2002 establishments in British Columbia